Mercer County is a county located in the U.S. state of New Jersey. Its county seat is Trenton, also the state capital, prompting its nickname The Capital County. Mercer County alone constitutes the Trenton–Princeton metropolitan statistical area and is considered part of the New York metropolitan area by the U.S. Census Bureau, but also directly borders the Philadelphia metropolitan area and is included within the Federal Communications Commission's Philadelphia designated media market. 

As of the 2020 United States census, the county retained its position as the state's 12th-most-populous county, with a population of 387,340, its highest decennial count ever and an increase of 20,827 (+5.7%) from the 2010 census count of 366,513, which in turn reflected an increase of 15,752 (+4.5%) from the 350,761 enumerated in the 2000 census

The county was formed by an act of the New Jersey Legislature on February 22, 1838, from portions of Burlington County (Nottingham Township, now Hamilton Township), Hunterdon County (Ewing Township, Lawrence Township, Trenton, and portions of Hopewell Township), and Middlesex County, (West Windsor Township and portions of East Windsor Township). The former Keith Line bisects the county and is the boundary between municipalities that previously had been separated into West Jersey and East Jersey.

Trenton–Mercer Airport in Ewing Township is a commercial and corporate aviation airport serving Mercer County and its surrounding vicinity. The official residence of the governor of New Jersey, known as Drumthwacket, is located in Princeton, and is listed on both the U.S. National Register of Historic Places and the New Jersey Register of Historic Places. Mercer County contains 12 municipalities, the fewest of any county in New Jersey, and equal to Hudson County. The county is located in the Central Jersey region.

History

Etymology
The county was named for Continental Army General Hugh Mercer, who died as a result of wounds received at the Battle of Princeton on January 3, 1777. Continental Army Brigadier General Hugh Mercer served in the Continental Army during the Battles of Trenton and Princeton in 1777. A Scotsman that fled to British North America after the failed Jacobite Rebellion, he worked closely with George Washington in the American Revolution. On January 3, 1777, Washington's army was en route to Princeton, New Jersey. While leading a vanguard of 350 soldiers, Mercer's brigade encountered two British regiments and a mounted unit. A fight broke out at an orchard grove and Mercer's horse was shot from under him. Getting to his feet, he was quickly surrounded by British troops who mistook him for George Washington and ordered him to surrender. Outnumbered, he drew his saber and began an unequal contest. He was finally beaten to the ground, bayoneted repeatedly (seven times), and left for dead.  Legend has it that a beaten Mercer, with a bayonet still impaled in him, did not want to leave his men and the battle and was given a place to rest on a white oak tree's trunk, and those who remained with him stood their ground. The Mercer Oak, against which the dying general rested as his men continued to fight, appears on the county seal and stood for 250 years until it collapsed in 2000.

History
Founded February 22, 1838, from portions of surrounding counties, Mercer County has a historical impact that reaches back to the pivotal battles of the American Revolutionary War.  On the night of December 25–26, 1776, General George Washington led American forces across the Delaware River to attack the Hessian forces in the Battle of Trenton on the morning of December 26, also known as the First Battle of Trenton. Following the battle, Washington crossed back to Pennsylvania. He crossed a third time in a surprise attack on the forces of General Charles Cornwallis at the Battle of the Assunpink Creek, on January 2, 1777, also known as the Second Battle of Trenton, and at the Battle of Princeton on January 3. The successful attacks built morale among the pro-independence colonists. Ewing Church Cemetery in Ewing is one of the oldest cemeteries in the area, having served the Ewing community for 300 years. It is home to the burial places of hundreds of veterans from The Revolutionary War to the Vietnam War.

Since 1790, Trenton has served as the state's capital, earning the county the name "the Capitial County." After the Legislature relocated to Trenton from Perth Amboy in 1790, it purchased land for £250 and 5 shillings and constructed a new state house, designed by Philadelphia-based architect Jonathan Doane, beginning in 1792. The Doane building was covered in stucco, measured 150 by 50 feet (46 m × 15 m), and housed the Senate and Assembly chambers in opposite wings. To meet the demands of the growing state, the structure was expanded several times during the 19th century. New Jersey, along with Nevada, is the only state to have its capital be located at the border with another state, as Trenton across the Delaware River from Pennsylvania. 

The county experienced rapid urbanization and population growth during the first half of the 20th century due to the growth of industrialization in places such as the city of Trenton. Mercer County has the distinction of being the famed landing spot for a fictional Martian invasion of the United States. In 1938, in what has become one of the most famous American radio plays of all time, Orson Welles acted out his The War of the Worlds invasion. His imaginary aliens first "landed" at what is now West Windsor Township.  A commemorative monument is erected at Grover's Mill park. 

There were 27 Mercer County residents killed during the September 11, 2001 terrorist attacks in Lower Manhattan.

Geography and climate 

The county is generally flat and low-lying on the inner coastal plain with a few hills closer to the Delaware River. The lowest point is at sea level along the Delaware River.

Climate 
Most of Mercer has a hot-summer humid continental climate (Dfa) except for the southern portion of the county near and including Trenton where a humid subtropical climate (Cfa) exists. The hardiness zones are 6b and 7a.

Demographics

2020 census
As of the 2020 United States census, Mercer County has a population of 387,340, making it the 12th most populous county in the state. The racial makeup of the county is quite diverse with 62.3% of the population identifying as white (and 46.7% as non-Hispanic whites), 21.6% of the population being black/African American, and 12.6% of the county's population identifying as Asian. 19.4% of Mercer County is Hispanic/Latino, 0.9% of the population is American Native/Alaskan Native/Native Hawaiian/Pacific Islander, and 2.6% identify as two or more races.

5.4% of Mercer County is under the age of 5, while 21.2% are under the age of 18, and 16.0% are over the age of 65. The female population of the county stands at 50.8%, which is in line with the state as a whole.

There are 150,657 housing units in Mercer County, with 63.5% of them being owned by the occupiers. There are 131,440 households with an average of 2.67 persons per household.

2010 census

Economy
Based on data from the Bureau of Economic Analysis, Mercer County had a gross domestic product (GDP) of $28.5 billion in 2018, which was ranked 9th in the state and represented an increase of 2.3% from the previous year.

In 2015, the county had a per capita personal income of $63,720, the sixth-highest in New Jersey, and ranked 121st of 3,113 counties in the United States. Mercer County stands among the highest-income counties in the United States, with the Bureau of Economic Analysis having ranked the county as having the 78th-highest per capita income of all 3,113 counties in the United States (and the sixth-highest in New Jersey) as of 2009. Trenton's role as New Jersey's state capital contributes significantly to Mercer County's economic standing. 9.5% of the population is considered at or below the poverty line. 

The median household income in Mercer County is $83,306. 89.6% of the population has a high school diploma, and 43.5% of the county's population has a Bachelor's degree or higher, one of the highest rates in the state, as of the 2020 census.

Government

County government

Mercer County has a county executive form of government, in which the Mercer County Executive performs executive functions, administering the operation of the county, and a Board of County Commissioners acts in a legislative capacity. The county executive is directly elected to a four-year term of office. The seven-member Board of County Commissioners, previously known as the Board of Chosen Freeholders, is elected at-large to serve three-year staggered terms of office on a staggered basis, with either two or three seats up for election each year. The Board is led by a Commissioner Chair and Vice-Chair, selected from among its members at an annual reorganization meeting held in January. The Commissioner Board establishes policy and provides a check on the powers of the County Executive.  The Board approves all county contracts and gives advice and consent to the County Executive's appointments of department heads, and appointments to boards and commissions. The Commissioner Board votes to approve the budget prepared by the Executive after review and modifications are made. In 2016, freeholders were paid $29,763 and the freeholder director was paid an annual salary of $31,763. That year, the county executive was paid $164,090 per year.

, the County Executive is Brian M. Hughes (D, Princeton, term of office ends December 31, 2023). Mercer County's Commissioners are (with terms for Chair and Vice-Chair ending every December 31st): 

Pursuant to Article VII Section II of the New Jersey State Constitution, each county in New Jersey is required to have three elected administrative officials known as "constitutional officers." These officers are the County Clerk and County Surrogate (both elected for five-year terms of office) and the County Sheriff (elected for a three-year term). Mercer County's constitutional officers are:

Law enforcement on the county level is provided by the Mercer County Sheriff's Office and the Mercer County Prosecutor's Office. The Mercer County Prosecutor is Angelo J. Onofri of Hamilton Township, who took office in December 2016 after being nominated by Governor of New Jersey Chris Christie and being confirmed by the New Jersey Senate. Mercer County constitutes Vicinage 7 of the Superior Court of New Jersey. The vicinage is seated at the Mercer County Criminal Courthouse, located at 400 South Warren Street in Trenton. The vicinage has additional facilities for the Civil, Special Civil, General Equity, and Family Parts at the Mercer County Civil Courthouse, located at 175 South Broad Street, also in Trenton. The Assignment Judge for Mercer County is Mary C. Jacobson.

Federal representatives 
Portions of the 3rd and 12th Congressional Districts cover the county.

State representatives

Politics 
Mercer County is a reliably Democratic county; it has gone for Republicans only three times (1956, 1972, 1984) since 1936. In each presidential election of the 21st century, the Democratic candidate earned at least 60% of the vote. Since the 2008 election, every municipality has voted for the Democratic candidate. As of October 1, 2021, there were a total of 265,703 registered voters in Mercer County, of whom 121,653 (45.8%) were registered as Democrats, 41,701 (15.7%) were registered as Republicans and 98,343 (37.0%) were registered as unaffiliated. There were 4,006 voters (1.5%) registered to other parties.

In 2008, the county voted for Barack Obama by a 35.4% margin over John McCain, with Obama winning New Jersey by 14.4% over McCain. He won by a similar margin in 2012 and Hillary Clinton did so in 2016. Joe Biden won the county by 40.0% in 2020, the widest margin for anyone since 1964 by winning with 69.1% of the vote (122,532 votes) to Trump's 29.1% (51,641 votes).

|}

In the 2009 New Jersey gubernatorial election, Republican Chris Christie lost the county with 39.27%	of the vote (39,769 votes) to incumbent Democratic governor Jon Corzine's	54.51%	(55,199	votes), while Independent candidate Chris Daggett won 5.36%	of the vote. (5,424 votes). In the 2013 New Jersey gubernatorial election, Republican governor Chris Christie became the only Republican to win the county since 1993 with 51.9% of the vote (48,530 votes) to Democrat Barbara Buono's	46.3% (43,282 votes). In the 2017 New Jersey gubernatorial election, Democrat Phil Murphy won the county 64.9% to (59,992 votes) 33.1% (30,645 votes). In the 2021 gubernatorial election, Republican Jack Ciattarelli received 34.1% of the vote (34,617 ballots cast) to Democrat Phil Murphy's 65.1% (66,151 votes).

Transportation

Roads and highways
Mercer County has county routes, state routes, U.S. Routes and Interstates that all pass through.

The county roads that traverse through are NJ County Route 518 (only in the Hopewells), NJ County Route 524, County Route 526, NJ County Route 533, NJ County Route 535, NJ County Route 539, NJ County Route 546, NJ County Route 569, NJ County Route 571, and NJ County Route 583.

The state routes that pass through Mercer are NJ Route 27 (only in Princeton), NJ Route 29, NJ Route 31, NJ Route 33, NJ Route 129, and NJ Route 133 (only in East Windsor). There are three U.S. Routes that pass through Mercer County: U.S. Route 1, which bisects the county, U.S. Route 130, and U.S. Route 206.

Mercer County houses a few limited access roads, such as Interstate 295, Interstate 195, and the New Jersey Turnpike (Interstate 95). (Mercer is the only county in the state that hosts I-95 and both its auxiliary routes.) I-295 functions as a partial ring-road around the Trenton area, while I-195 serves as an east-west expressway from Trenton to the Jersey Shore. The Turnpike (I-95) passes through the southeastern section of the County, and serves as a major corridor to Delaware, Washington, D.C. to the south, and New York City and New England towards the north. Two turnpike interchanges are located within Mercer County: Exit 7A in Robbinsville Township and Exit 8 in East Windsor Township.

Before 2018, Interstate 95 abruptly ended at the interchange with US 1 in Lawrence Township, and became I-295 south. Signs directed motorists to the continuation of I-95 by using I-295 to I-195 east to the New Jersey Turnpike. This was all due in part to the cancellation of the Somerset Freeway that was supposed to go from Hopewell Township in Mercer County up to Franklin Township in Somerset County.

The section of I-95 west of the US 1 interchange in Lawrence was re-numbered as part of I-295 in March 2018, six months before a direct interchange with Interstate 95 in Pennsylvania and the Pennsylvania Turnpike opened. This planned interchange indirectly prompted another project: the New Jersey Turnpike Authority extended the 'dual-dual' configuration (inner car lanes and outer truck / bus / car lanes) to Interchange 6 in Mansfield Township, Burlington County from its former end at Interchange 8A in Monroe Township, Middlesex County. This widening was completed in early November 2014.

Public transportation
Mercer hosts several NJ Transit stations, including Trenton, Hamilton and Princeton Junction on the Northeast Corridor Line, as well as Princeton on the Princeton Branch. SEPTA provides rail service to Center City Philadelphia from Trenton and West Trenton. Long-distance transportation is provided by Amtrak train service along the Northeast Corridor through the Trenton Transit Center.

NJ Transit's River Line connects Trenton to Camden, with three stations in the county, all within Trenton city limits, at Cass Street, Hamilton Avenue and at the Trenton Transit Center.

Mercer County's only commercial airport, and one of three in the state, is Trenton–Mercer Airport in Ewing Township, which is served by Frontier Airlines, offering nonstop service to and from points nationwide.

Municipalities

The 12 municipalities in Mercer County (with 2010 Census data for population, housing units and area) are:

Historical Municipalities 
Nottingham Township (1688-1856)
Princeton Township (1838-2013)
Borough of Princeton (1813-2013)
Washington Township (renamed Robbinsville Township in 2005)

Sports
Mercer County has a number of large parks. The largest, Mercer County Park is the home for the US Olympic Rowing Team's training center.

Mercer County is also the home of the Trenton Thunder baseball team, playing in the MLB Draft League, and the Jersey Flight of the National Arena League. The Thunder were formerly the Double-A affiliate of the New York Yankees playing in the Eastern League before the 2021 Minor League reorganization. The minor league hockey team, the Trenton Titans, established in 1999 and operating as the ECHL affiliate of the NHL's Philadelphia Flyers and the AHL's Adirondack Phantoms, disbanded before the start of the 2013–14 season.

Collegiate athletics
Mercer County is also home to several college athletic programs, including two NCAA DI schools. Rider University competes as the Rider Broncs in the MAAC. In wrestling, Rider is a member of the Eastern Wrestling League. The Princeton Tigers compete in the Ivy League.

The College of New Jersey Lions compete in the NCAA DIII as a member of the New Jersey Athletic Conference and the Eastern College Athletic Conference.

Mercer County Community College competes as the Mercer Vikings as a member of the Garden State Athletic Conference and the National Junior College Athletic Association.

Education
School districts in the county include:

K-12

 East Windsor Regional School District
 Ewing Public Schools
 Hamilton Township School District
 Hopewell Valley Regional School District
 Lawrence Township School District
 Mercer County Special Services School District
 Princeton Public Schools
 Robbinsville Public School District
 Trenton Public Schools
 West Windsor-Plainsboro Regional School District

9-12
 Mercer County Technical Schools

Special
There is a state-operated school, Marie H. Katzenbach School for the Deaf.

Higher Education
Mercer County is home to Princeton University, Princeton Theological Seminary, the Institute for Advanced Study, Rider University, Westminster Choir College, The College of New Jersey, and Thomas Edison State University. Mercer County Community College is a county-run community college located in West Windsor.

Points of interest
 Drumthwacket, The official residence of the Governor of New Jersey located in Princeton
 New Jersey State House, The capitol complex of New Jersey and the meeting point of the state legislature, located at the state capital in Trenton
 Mercer County Park, in West Windsor
 Hamilton Veterans Park
 Mercer County Park September 11 Memorial
 Assunpink Creek (part)
 Mercer Lake at Mercer County Park
 Griggstown Native Grassland Preserve (part)
 Princeton Battlefield
 Mercer Oaks Golf Course
 Washington Crossing State Park, in Hopewell Township 
 Colonial Memorial Park in Trenton
 Lower Trenton Bridge
 Trenton War Memorial
 Trenton Thunder Ballpark

Wineries
 Hopewell Valley Vineyards
 Working Dog Winery, in Robbinsville Township

See also

 National Register of Historic Places listings in Mercer County, New Jersey

Notes

References

External links

 Official County Website
 Mercer County Library System

 
1838 establishments in New Jersey
Central Jersey
Counties in the New York metropolitan area
Populated places established in 1838